François Lajugie (born 31 May 1996) is a French professional footballer who plays as a centre-back or midfielder for Annecy.

Career
Lajugie is a youth product of Malermot, Brive, and Nantes , before returning to Brive. He made his senior and professional debut with Orléans as a half-time substitute in a 4–1 Ligue 2 loss to Arles-Avignon on 15 May 2015. He had a brief stint with CA Bastia in the 2016–17 season, before moving to Limoges in 2017. In 2018 he moved to Bastia-Borgo in the Championnat National where he spent 4 seasons. On 4 June 2022, he returned to Ligue 2 with a transfer to the newly promoted side Annecy.

Personal life
Outside of football, Lajugie has also studied economics post-secondarily.

References

External links
 
 Ligue 2 profile

1996 births
Living people
Sportspeople from Bordeaux
French footballers
US Orléans players
CA Bastia players
Limoges FC players
FC Bastia-Borgo players
FC Annecy players
Ligue 2 players
Championnat National players
Championnat National 2 players
Association football defenders
Association football midfielders